Princess of Ligne is a title that is used by the wife of a Prince of Ligne.

Baroness of Ligne
1120–?: Marguerite de Fontaines-l'Eveque (wife of Thierry I)
1176–?: Elisabeth d'Antoing (first wife of Thierry II)
?–1190: Andeline d'Havre (second wife of Thierry II)
1190–?: Mahaut de Mons (wife of Wauthier I)
1229–1234: Marguerite de Fontaines-l'Eveque (first wife of Wauthier II)
?–1245: Alide de Rumigny (second wife of Wauthier II)
1245–1245: Julianne de Rosay (first wife of Wauthier III)
?–?: Unnamed (second wife of Wauthier III)
1248–1290?: Alix d'Aspremont (third wife of Wauthier III)
1290–1300?: Isabelle van Strjen-Sevenbergen (wife of Jean I)
1305–?: Jeanne de Conde (first wife of Fastre)
?–1337?: Marguerite de Gavere (second wife of Fastre)
1340–1345?: Anne d'Antoing (wife of Michel I)
?–1371?: Eleonore de Lalaing (wife of Michel II)
?–1387: Berthe von Schleiden (wife of Guillaume)
1387–1435: Eustachie de Barbancon (first wife of Jean II)
?–1442?: Isabelle van Strjen-Sevenbergen (second wife of Jean II)
1442–1469: Bonne d'Abbeville (wife of Michel III)
1472–1486: Jacqueline de Croy (wife of Jean III)
1501–1525: Philipotte de Luxembourg (wife of Antoine)
1532–1545: Maria van Wassenaer, Burgravine van Leiden (first wife of Jacques)

Countess of Ligne

Princess of Ligne

Notes

Sources

 
Ligne
Ligne